Gyan Singh may refer to:

Gyan Singh (Fijian politician)
Gyan Singh (Indian politician) (born 1953)